Three of Coins is a third card in the suit of coins. The suit is used in Spanish, Italian and tarot decks. 

In tarot, the Three of Coins (also called the Three of Pentacles) is part of what tarot card readers call the "Minor Arcana". Tarot cards are used throughout much of Europe to play tarot card games.

In English-speaking countries, where the games are largely unknown, Tarot cards came to be utilized primarily for divinatory purposes.

Card reading
In tarot, positive attributes of the Three of Pentacles in a spread include the mastery of a skill in trade or work; achieving perfection; artistic ability; and dignity through renown rank or power.  Negative attributes (when card is in reverse) include sloppiness resulting in a lower quality outcome; lack of skill; banal ideas; and preoccupation with off task concerns.

References

Suit of Coins